Albert George "Ab" Box (March 8, 1909 – July 30, 2000) was a Canadian professional football halfback, quarterback and punter.

Born in Toronto, Box attended Malvern Collegiate Institute where he played on the football team and later on the Malvern Grads junior team from 1928-1929 under coach Ted Reeve. Box then moved to the senior Ontario Rugby Football Union, again playing under Reeve with the Toronto Balmy Beach Beachers from 1930-1931, winning the Grey Cup in 1930. Box then played three seasons with the Toronto Argonauts, winning another Grey Cup in 1933 and being voted the Jeff Russel Memorial Trophy winner as the most valuable player for 1934. He returned to Balmy Beach in 1935 and played another four years there.

Box also played on championship baseball and softball teams.

He has been inducted into the Canadian Football Hall of Fame (1965) and Canada's Sports Hall of Fame (1975). A sportswriter for the Toronto Telegram from 1932-35, Box was known not only for his incredible athletic ability but also for his superb sportsmanship. After his retirement, he worked as a salesman during the winter and operated a lodge during the summer. Box died in Toronto at age 91.

References

External links
Canada's Sports Hall of Fame profile

1909 births
2000 deaths
Canadian Football Hall of Fame inductees
Canadian football punters
Canadian football quarterbacks
Canadian football running backs
Ontario Rugby Football Union players
Players of Canadian football from Ontario
Canadian football people from Toronto
Toronto Argonauts players
Toronto Balmy Beach Beachers players